Gianluca Valoti (born 16 February 1973) is an Italian former professional road racing cyclist, who currently works as a directeur sportif for UCI Continental team .

Major results
1996
 1st GP Capodarco
 2nd GP Industria Artigianato e Commercio Carnaghese
 2nd Giro d'Oro
 5th Coppa Placci
 10th Giro dell'Emilia
1997
 5th Trofeo dello Scalatore
1998
 9th Trofeo dello Scalatore
1999
 4th Subida a Urkiola
 8th Gran Premio Città di Camaiore
2000
 7th Tre Valli Varesine
 9th Trofeo dello Scalatore
2001
 10th Giro dell'Emilia
 10th Gran Premio Città di Camaiore
2002
 3rd Overall Brixia Tour

Grand Tour general classification results timeline

References

External links

1973 births
Living people
Italian male cyclists
People from Alzano Lombardo
Cyclists from the Province of Bergamo